Bugyals are alpine pasture lands, or meadows, in higher elevation range between  and  of the Himalayas in the Indian state of Uttarakhand, where they are called "nature’s own gardens". The topography of the terrain is either flat or sloped. The surface of these bugyals is covered with natural green grass and seasonal flowers. They are used by tribal herdsmen to graze their cattle. During the winter season the alpine meadows remain snow-covered. During summer months, the Bugyals present a riot of beautiful flowers and grass.  As bugyals constitute very fragile ecosystems, particular attention needs to be given for their conservation.

Some of the notable bugyals are: Auli near Joshimath, Garsi, Kwanri, Gulabi Kantha, Bedni, Panwali Kantha and Kush Kalyan, Dayara, Gidara, Bagji Bugyal and Munsiyari.

List of Bugyals

Conservation issues
Bugyal is a fragile ecosystem and it is essential to maintain a balance between ecology and environment. In this context a court case was filed by the public objecting to erection of the prefab houses and by introducing non-biodegradable matter in the upper meadows of the bugyals by the tourism departments. It was averred that the peace and tranquility of the bugyals was getting affected. The court had ordered that the polluter must pay for the damage to environment based on absolute liability principle, which covered payment of damages to the affected people but also to compensate for all costs for restoration of the degraded environments.

See also 
 Meadow
 Grassland
 Shola

References

Bibliography
Pandey, Abhimanyu, Nawraj Pradhan, Swapnil Chaudhari, and Rucha Ghate. "Withering of traditional institutions? An institutional analysis of the decline of migratory pastoralism in the rangelands of the Kailash Sacred Landscape, western Himalayas." Environmental Sociology 3, no. 1 (2017): 87–100.

Montane grasslands and shrublands
Ecoregions of India
Geography of Uttarakhand
Grasslands of India